Torchwood is a British science fiction television programme created by Russell T Davies. A spin-off of the 2005 revival of Doctor Who, it aired from 2006 to 2011. Numerous novels and audio books based on the series have been released.

Novels

Audio books

Radio plays

See also
List of Torchwood episodes
List of Torchwood comics
Torchwood (audio drama series)
List of television series made into books

References

 
 
Novels and audio books